SAPN may stand for:

 SA Power Networks, Australian electric utility
 Sexual Abuse Prevention Network, New Zealand organisation
 Société des Autoroutes de Paris Normandie, French company